The French invasion of Russia, also known as the Russian campaign, the Second Polish War, the Army of Twenty nations, and the Patriotic War of 1812 was launched by Napoleon to force the Russian Empire back into the continental blockade of the United Kingdom. Napoleon's invasion of Russia is one of the best studied military campaigns in history and is listed among the most lethal military operations in world history. It is characterized by the massive toll on human life: in less than six months nearly a million soldiers and civilians died.

On 24 June 1812 and the following days, the first wave of the multinational  crossed the Niemen into Russia. Through a series of long forced marches, Napoleon pushed his army of almost half a million people rapidly through Western Russia, now Belarus, in an attempt to destroy the separated Russian armies of Barclay de Tolly and Pyotr Bagration who amounted to around 180,000–220,000 at this time. Within six weeks, Napoleon lost half of the men because of the extreme weather conditions, disease and hunger, winning just the Battle of Smolensk. The Russian Army continued to retreat, under its new Commander in Chief Mikhail Kutuzov, employing attrition warfare against Napoleon forcing the invaders to rely on a supply system that was incapable of feeding their large army in the field.

There Kutuzov decided not to defend the city but to a general withdrawal to save the Russian army. (At the time, Moscow was a very important city, but not the capital of Russia; from 1732 to 1918, Saint Petersburg served as a capital). On 14 September, Napoleon and his army of about 100,000 men occupied Moscow, only to find it abandoned, and the city was soon ablaze, instigated by its military governor. Napoleon stayed in Moscow for five weeks, waiting for a peace offer that never came. Because of the nice weather he left late, hoping to reach the magazines in Smolensk by a detour. Losing the Battle of Maloyaroslavets he was forced to take the same route as he came. In early November it began to snow, which complicated the retreat. Lack of food and winter clothes for the men and fodder for the horses, and guerilla warfare from Russian peasants and Cossacks led to greater losses. Again more than half of the men died on the roadside of exhaustion, typhus and the harsh continental climate. The Grande Armée had deteriorated into a disorganized mob, and the Russians could not conclude otherwise. 

In the Battle of Krasnoi Napoleon was able to avoid a complete defeat. Meanwhile, he was almost without cavalry and artillery, and deployed the Old Guard for the first time. Although several retreating French corps united with the main army, when the Berezina was reached, Napoleon had only about 49,000 troops and 40,000 stragglers of little military value. On 5 December, Napoleon left the army at Smorgonie in a sledge and returned to Paris. Within a few days, 20,000 more perished from the bitter cold and louse-borne diseases. Murat and Ney, the new commanders, continued, leaving more than 20,000 men behind in the hospitals of Vilnius. What was left of the main armies crossed the frozen Niemen and the Bug disillusioned.

Although estimates vary because precise records were not kept, numbers were exaggerated and auxiliary troops were not always counted, Napoleon's army entered Russia with more than 450,000 men, more than 150,000 horses, around 25,000 wagons and almost 1,400 pieces of artillery.  Only 120,000 men survived (excluding early deserters); as many as 380,000 died in the campaign. Consequently, Napoleon's reputation of invincibility was shattered.

Background

 

From 1792 and onwards, France had been at a near constant state of war with the major European powers, a consequence of the French Revolution. Napoleon, who seized power in 1799 and ruled France as an autocrat, conducted several military campaigns which resulted in the creation of the first French empire. Starting in 1803, the Napoleonic Wars had proven Napoleon's abilities. He emerged victorious in the War of the Third Coalition (18031806, which dissolved the thousand-year-old Holy Roman Empire), the War of the Fourth Coalition (18061807), and the War of the Fifth Coalition (1809).

In 1807, Napoleon and Alexander I of Russia had signed the Treaty of Tilsit on the Neman River after a French victory at Friedland. The treaties had gradually strengthened Russia's alliance with France and made Napoleon dominate all their neighbors. The agreement made Russia a French ally and they adopted the Continental System, which was a blockade on the United Kingdom. But the treaty was economically hard on Russia, and Tsar Alexander left the Continental blockade on 31 December 1810. Napoleon was now deprived of his chief foreign policy tool against the United Kingdom.

The Treaty of Schönbrunn, which ended the 1809 war between Austria and France had a clause removing Western Galicia from Austria and annexing it to the Grand Duchy of Warsaw. Russia viewed this as against its interests as they considered the territory to be a potential launching point for a French invasion.

Napoleon had tried to get better Russian cooperation through an alliance by seeking to marry Anna Pavlovna, the youngest sister of Alexander. But finally, he married Marie Louise, the daughter of the Austrian emperor instead.  France and Austria signed an alliance treaty on 14 March 1812.

Napoleon himself was not in the same physical and mental state as in years past. He had become overweight and increasingly prone to various maladies.

Declaration of war

Committed to the expansion policy of Catherine the Great, Alexander I had issued an ultimatum demanding that France evacuate its troops from Prussia and the Grand Duchy of Warsaw in April 1812. Napoleon chose war over retreat.

Officially Napoleon announced the following proclamation: Soldiers, the second Polish war is begun. The first terminated at Friedland, and at Tilsit, Russia vowed an eternal alliance with France, and war with the English. She now breaks her vows and refuses to give any explanation of her strange conduct until the French eagles have repassed the Rhine, and left our allies at her mercy. Russia is hurried away by a fatality: her destinies will be fulfilled. Does she think us degenerated? Are we no more the soldiers who fought at Austerlitz? She places us between dishonour and war—our choice cannot be difficult. Let us then march forward; let us cross the Niemen and carry the war into her country. This second Polish war will be as glorious for the French arms as the first has been, but the peace we shall conclude shall carry with it its own guarantee, and will terminate the fatal influence which Russia for fifty years past has exercised in Europe.Between the 8th and the 20th of June, the troops had been in perpetual motion and daily had to undertake the most arduous marches in the most abominable heat. Napoleon's objective was to rout the Imperial Russian army and force Czar Alexander I to return to the Continental System.

Logistics

 

The invasion of Russia clearly and dramatically demonstrates the importance of logistics in military planning, especially when the land will not provide for the number of troops deployed in an area of operations far exceeding the experience of the invading army. Napoleon made extensive preparations for provisioning his army. The French supply effort was far greater than in any of the previous campaigns. The Vistula river valley was built up in 1811–1812 as a supply base. Intendant General Guillaume-Mathieu Dumas established five lines of supply from the Rhine to the Vistula. French-controlled Germany and Poland were organized into three arrondissements with their own administrative headquarters. The logistical buildup that followed was a critical test of Napoleon's administrative and logistical skill, who devoted his efforts during the first half of 1812 largely to the provisioning of his invasion army. Napoleon studied Russian geography and the history of Charles XII's invasion of 1708–1709 and understood the need to bring forward as many supplies as possible. The French Army already had previous experience of operating in the lightly populated and underdeveloped conditions of Poland and East Prussia during the War of the Fourth Coalition in 1806–1807.

However, nothing was to go as planned, because Napoleon had failed to take into account conditions that were totally different from what he had known so far.

Rapid forced marches had dazed and confused old-order Austrian and Prussian armies and much use had been made of foraging. Forced marches in Russia often made troops do without supplies as the supply wagons struggled to keep up; furthermore, horse-drawn wagons and artillery were stalled by lack of roads which often turned to mud due to rainstorms. Lack of food and water in thinly populated, much less agriculturally dense regions led to the death of troops and their mounts by exposing them to waterborne diseases from drinking from mud puddles and eating rotten food and forage. The front of the army received whatever could be provided while the formations behind starved.
The most advanced magazine in the operations area during the attack phase was Vilna, beyond that point, the army was on its own.

Ammunition
A massive arsenal was established in Warsaw. Artillery was concentrated at Magdeburg, Danzig, Stettin, Küstrin and Glogau. Magdeburg contained a siege artillery train with 100 heavy guns and stored 462 cannons, two million paper cartridges and 300,000 pounds/135 tonnes of gunpowder; Danzig had a siege train with 130 heavy guns and 300,000 pounds of gunpowder; Stettin contained 263 guns, a million cartridges and 200,000 pounds/90 tonnes of gunpowder; Küstrin contained 108 guns and a million cartridges; Glogau contained 108 guns, a million cartridges and 100,000 pounds/45 tonnes of gunpowder. Warsaw, Danzig, Modlin, Thorn and Marienburg became ammunition and supply depots as well. Polish legions, including Lithuanians formed the largest foreign contingent.

Provisions and transportation

Danzig contained enough provisions to feed 400,000 men for 50 days. Breslau, Plock and Wyszogród were turned into grain depots, milling vast quantities of flour for delivery to Thorn, where 60,000 biscuits were produced every day. A large bakery was established at Villenberg (Braniewo County). 50,000 cattle were collected to follow the army. After the invasion began, large magazines were constructed at Kovno (Kaunas), Vilna (Vilnius),  and Minsk, with the Vilna base having enough rations to feed 100,000 men for 40 days. It also contained 27,000 muskets, 30,000 pairs of shoes along with brandy and wine. Medium-sized depots were established at Vitebsk, Orsha, and Smolensk, and several small ones throughout the Russian interior. The French also captured numerous intact Russian supply dumps, which the Russians had failed to destroy or empty, and Moscow itself was filled with food. Twenty train battalions provided most of the transportation, with a combined load of 8,390 tons. Twelve of these battalions had a total of 3,024 heavy wagons drawn by four horses each, four had 2,424 one-horse light wagons and four had 2,400 wagons drawn by oxen. Auxiliary supply convoys were formed on Napoleon's orders in early June 1812, using vehicles requisitioned in East Prussia. Marshal Nicolas Oudinot's IV Corps alone took 600 carts formed into six companies. The wagon trains were supposed to carry enough bread, flour and medical supplies for 300,000 men for two months.

The standard heavy wagons, well-suited for the dense and partially paved road networks of Germany and France, proved too cumbersome for the sparse and primitive Russian dirt tracks. The supply route from Smolensk to Moscow was therefore entirely dependent on light wagons with small loads. Central to the problem were the expanding distances to supply magazines and the fact that no supply wagon could keep up with a forced marched infantry column. The weather itself became an issue, where, according to historian Richard K. Riehn:

The heavy losses to disease, hunger and desertion in the early months of the campaign were in large part due to the inability to transport provisions quickly enough to the troops. The Intendance administration failed to distribute with sufficient rigor the supplies that were built up or captured. By that, despite all these preparations, the Grande Armée was not self-sufficient logistically and still depended on foraging to a significant extent.

Inadequate supplies played a key role in the losses suffered by the army as well. Davidov and other Russian campaign participants record wholesale surrenders of starving members of the  even before the onset of the frosts. Caulaincourt describes men swarming over and cutting up horses that slipped and fell, even before the horse had been killed.  The French simply were unable to feed their army.  Starvation led to a general loss of cohesion. Constant harassment of the French Army by Cossacks added to the losses during the retreat.

Though starvation caused horrendous casualties in Napoleon's army, losses arose from other sources as well. The main body of Napoleon's  diminished by a third in just the first eight weeks of the campaign, before the major battle was fought. This loss in strength was in part due to diseases such as diphtheria, dysentery and typhus and the need for garrison supply centres. There are eyewitness reports of cannibalism in November 1812.

Combat service and support and medicine
Nine pontoon companies, three pontoon trains with 100 pontoons each, two companies of marines, nine sapper companies, six miner companies and an engineer park were deployed for the invasion force. Large-scale military hospitals were created at Warsaw, Thorn, Breslau, Marienburg, Elbing and Danzig, while hospitals in East Prussia had beds for 28,000.

Invasion

Crossing the Russian border

After a whole day of preparation, the invasion commenced on Wednesday,  with Napoleon's army crossing the border. The army was split up into five columns:

1. The left wing under Macdonald with the X corps of 30,000 men (half of them Prussians) crossed the Niemen at Tilsit on the 24th. He moved north in Courland but did not succeed in occupying Riga. Early August he occupied Dunaburg; early September he returned to Riga with his entire force. On 18 December, a few days after the French left the Russian Empire, he drew back to Königsberg, followed by Peter Wittgenstein. On 25 December one of his generals Yorck von Wartenburg found himself isolated because the Russian army blocked the road. After five days he was urged by his officers (and in the presence of Carl von Clausewitz), at least to neutralization of his troops and an armistice. Yorck's resolution had enormous consequences.

2. In the evening of 23 June  Morand accompanied by sappers occupied the other side of the Niemen. The next morning Napoleon followed by the Imperial Guard (47,000) crossed the river on one of the three pontoon bridges nearby Napoleon's Hill. Afterwards, Murat's cavalry and three corps crossed the river destined for Vilnius. Then they followed Barclay de Toll's First Army of the West to Drissa and Polotsk.

 Cavalry corps of Murat (32,000) advanced to Vilnius and Polotsk in the vanguard.
 I corps of Davout (72,000), the strongest corps, left Vilnius on 1 July and occupied Minsk a week later. His goal was to cut off Bagration from Barclay de Tolly. He already had lost a third of his men but beat Bagration at Mogilev and then went to Smolensk, where he joined the main army. 
II corps of Oudinot (37,000) crossed the Niemen and the Viliya to combat Peter Wittgenstein, who protected the road to St Petersburg. Oudinot didn't succeed in joining up with Macdonald and joined the VIth corps. For two months these corps kept Wittgenstein at a distance until the Second Battle of Polotsk.  
 III corps of Ney (39,000) defended downstream the 4th pontoon bridge at Aleksotas which could be used to escape; he then went to Polotsk.

Second Central force crossed at Pilona 20 km upstream.

IV corps of Beauharnais (45,000 Italians) crossed the Niemen near Pilona. Napoleon's stepson had orders to avoid Vilnius on his way to Vitebsk. 
VI corps of St. Cyr (25,000 Bavarians) crossed at Pilona. He was to throw himself between the two Russian armies and cut off all communication between them. He followed the II corps to Polotsk, forming the northern flank. Both corps never saw Moscow.

With French forces moving through different routes in the direction of Polotsk and Vitebsk, the first major engagement took place on 25 July at the Battle of Ostrowno.

3. Right flank force under Napoleon's brother Jérôme Bonaparte, King of Westphalia (62,000). He crossed the Niemen near Grodno on 1 July, and moved towards Bagration's (second western) army. It seems he was advancing slowly so the stragglers could catch up. On the order of Napoleon Davout secretly took over the command on 6 July. The Battle of Mir was a tactical victory for the Russians; Jerome let Platov escape by deploying too few of Poniatowki's troops. Jérôme left the army after being criticised by Davout. He went home at the end of July, taking a small battalion of guards with him. 
 IV Cavalry corps of Latour Maubourg (8,000) joined Davout.
V corps (36,000 (Polish) soldiers) under Poniatowski joined Davout and went to Mogilev and Smolensk. 
VIII Corps (17,000 Westphalians) under Vandamme who was sent home in early July. Jérôme Bonaparte took over but resigned on 15 July when he found out Davout had been secretly given the command. Early August the command was given to Junot. In the Battle of Smolensk (1812) Junot was sent to bypass the left flank of the Russian army, but he got lost and was unable to carry out this operation. Junot, a heavy drinker, was blamed for allowing the Russian army to retreat arriving too late at the Battle of Valutino. After the Battle of Borodino he had only 2,000 men left. Junot committed suicide in 1813?

4. The right or southern wing under Schwarzenberg (34,000) crossed the Western Bug on a pontoon bridge at Drohiczyn on 2 July. Tormasov's third army prevented him from joining up with Davout. When Tormasov occupied Brest (Belarus) at the end of July, Schwarzenberg and Reynier were cut off from supplies.  On 18 September the Austrians withdrew when Pavel Chichagov arrived from the south and seized Minsk on 18 November. On 14 December 1812 Schwarzenberg crossed the border.
VII corps of Reynier (17,000 Saxons) stayed in the Grodno region and cooperated with Schwarzenberg to protect the Duchy of Warsaw against Tormasov.

5. During the campaign reinforcements of 80,000 and the baggage trains with 30,000 men were sent on different dates. In November, the division of Durutte assisted Reynier. In December Loison was sent to help extricate the remnants of the Grand Army in its retreat. Within a few days many of Loison's unexperienced soldiers died of the extreme cold. 
 Napoleon arrested him for not marching with his division to the front. 
IX corps of Victor (33,000). The majority was sent to Smolensk in early September; he took over the command from St. Cyr. At the end of October, he retreated, losing significant supplies in Vitebsk to Wittgenstein. Victor and H.W. Daendels were ordered to cover the retreat to the Berezina.
XI corps of Augerau was part of the reserve. It was created later in the late summer. It contained an entire division of reformed deserters. This corps, based in Poland did not participate in military operations in Russia until November/December. Augereau never left Berlin; his younger brother general Jean-Pierre and his troops were compelled to surrender to the partisans Aleksandr Figner and Denis Davydov on 9 November.

March on Vilna

  

Napoleon initially met little resistance and moved quickly into the enemy's territory in spite of the transport of more than 1,100 cannons, being opposed by the Russian armies with more than 900 cannons. But the roads in this area of Lithuania were actually small dirt tracks through areas of birched woodland and marshes. At the beginning of the war supply lines already simply could not keep up with the forced marches of the corps and rear formations always suffered the worst privations.

On the 25th of June Murat's reserve cavalry provided the vanguard with Napoleon, the Imperial guard and Davout's 1st corps following behind. Napoleon spent the night and the next day in Kaunas, allowing only his guards,  not even the generals to enter the city. The next day he rushed towards the capital Vilna, pushing the infantry forward in columns that suffered from stifling heat, heavy rain and more heat. The central group marched  in two days. Ney's III Corps marched down the road to Sudervė, with Oudinot marching on the other side of the Viliya river. 

Since the end of April, the Russian headquarters was centred in Vilna but on June 24 couriers rushed news about the crossing of the Niemen to Barclay de Tolley. Before the night had passed, orders were sent out to Bagration and Platov, who commanded the Cossacks, to take the offensive. Alexander left Vilna on June 26 and Barclay assumed overall command.

Napoleon reached Vilna on 28 June with only light skirmishing but leaving more than 5,000 dead horses in his wake. These horses were vital to bringing up further supplies to an army in desperate need; he was forced to leave up to 100 guns and up to 500 artillery wagons. Napoleon had supposed that Alexander would sue for peace at this point and was to be disappointed; it would not be his last disappointment. Balashov demanded that the French returned across the Niemen before negotiations.  Barclay continued to retreat to Drissa, deciding that the concentration of the 1st and 2nd armies was his first priority.

Several days after crossing the Niemen, a number of soldiers began to develop high fevers and a red rash on their bodies. Typhus had made its appearance.  On 29/30 June, a violent thunderstorm struck Lithuania during the night and continued for several hours or a day.
 

The foraging in Lithuania proved hard as the land was mostly barren and forested. The supplies of forage were less than that of Poland, and two days of forced marching made a bad supply situation worse. Central to the problem were the expanding distances to supply magazines and the fact that no supply wagon could keep up with a forced marched infantry column. The weather itself became an issue.

A Lieutenant Mertens—a Württemberger serving with Ney's III corps—reported in his diary that oppressive heat followed by cold nights and rain left them with dead horses and camping in swamp-like conditions with dysentery and fever raging through the ranks with hundreds in a field hospital that had to be set up for the purpose. He reported the times, dates and places of events, reporting new thunderstorms on 6 July and men dying of sunstroke a few days later. Rapid forced marches quickly caused desertion, suicide and starvation, and exposed the troops to filthy water and disease, while the logistics trains lost horses by the thousands, further exacerbating the problems.

March on Vitebsk and Minsk

 

Although Barclay wanted to give battle, he assessed it as a hopeless situation and ordered Vilna's magazines burned and its bridge dismantled. Wittgenstein moved his command to Klaipeda, passing beyond Macdonald and Oudinot's operations with Wittgenstein's rear guard clashing with Oudinout's forward elements. Barclay continued his retreat and, with the exception of the occasional rearguard clash, remained unhindered in his movements ever further east.

The operation intended to split Bagration's forces from Barclay's forces by driving to Vilna had cost the French forces 25,000 losses from all causes in a few days. Strong probing operations were advanced from Vilna towards Nemenčinė, Molėtai in the north and Ashmyany in the east, the location of Bagration on his way to Minsk. Bagration ordered Platov and Dokhturov to distract the enemy.

Murat advanced to Nemenčinė on July 1, running into elements of Dmitry Dokhturov's III Russian Cavalry Corps. Napoleon assumed this was Bagration's 2nd Army and rushed out, before being told it was not. Napoleon then attempted to use Davout, Jerome, and Eugene out on his right in a hammer and anvil to catch Bagration and to destroy the 2nd Army in an operation before reaching Minsk. This operation had failed to produce results on his left.

Conflicting orders and lack of information had almost placed Bagration in a bind marching into Davout; however, Jerome could not arrive in time over the same mud tracks, supply problems, and weather, that had so badly affected the rest of the Grande Armée.  Command disputes between Jerome, General Vandamme and Davout would not help the situation.

In the first two weeks of July, the Grande Armée lost 100,000 men due to sickness and desertion. On 8 July Dirk van Hogendorp was appointed as Governor of Lithuania organizing hospitals for the wounded in Vilnius and supplies for the army; Louis Henri Loison was appointed in Königsberg. The main problem was forage from East Prussia.  For three weeks, the Dutch soldiers had hardly seen bread and only eaten soup. Desertion was high among Spanish and Portuguese formations. The deserters proceeded to terrorize the population, looting whatever lay to hand. The areas in which the  passed were devastated and depopulated.

Davout had lost 10,000 men marching to Minsk, which he reached on the 8th and would not attack Bagration without Jerome joining him. He ordered Polish cavalry to search for the thousands of looting soldiers who stayed behind. Davout left the city after four days where a Polish governor was appointed; Joseph Barbanègre had to organize the logistics. Davout crossed the Berezina and ran into the Battle of Mogilev with Bagration; he went to Orsha, and crossed the Dniepr on his way to Smolensk. Davout thought Bagration had some 60,000 men and Bagration thought Davout had 70,000. Bagration was getting orders from both Alexander's staff and Barclay (which Barclay didn't know) and left Bagration without a clear picture of what was expected of him and the general situation. This stream of confused orders to Bagration had him upset with Barclay, which would have repercussions later.

After five weeks, the loss of troops from disease and desertion had reduced Napoleon's effective fighting strength to about half. Ney and his corps were given ten days to recover and search for food.

March on Smolensk

Exactly at midnight, on July 16, Napoleon left Vilnius. On 19 July the Tsar left the army in Polotsk and headed for Moscow, taking the discredited Von Phull with him. Barclay, the Russian commander-in-chief, refused to fight despite Bagration's urgings. Several times he attempted to establish a strong defensive position, but each time the French advance was too quick for him to finish preparations and he was forced to retreat once more. When the French Army progressed further (under conditions of extreme heat and drought, rivers and wells filled with carrion) it encountered serious problems in foraging, aggravated by the scorched earth tactics of the Russian forces. After the battle of Vitebsk Napoleon discovered that the Russians were able to slip away during the night. The city, at the intersection of important trade routes, and the palace of Alexander of Württemberg would be his base for the next two weeks. His army needed to recover and rest, but Napoleon asked himself what to do next.

According to Antoine-Henri Jomini, the governor of Vilnius, Napoleon planned not to go further than Smolensk and make Vilnius his headquarter for the winter. However, he could not go back at the end of July. His position was unfavourable according to Adam Zamoyski. There was the heat - also at night - and the lack of supplies. He had lost a third of his army due to sickness and straggling.  The Russo-Turkish War (1806–1812) had come to an end as Kutuzov signed the Treaty of Bucharest and the Russian general Pavel Chichagov headed north-west. His former ally Bernadotte broke off relations with France and entered into an alliance with Russia (Treaty of Örebro). Mid-July Napoleon's brother Jérome resigned and decided to go home. (For Napoleon he lost the opportunity to destroy the Russian armies separately.)

On 4 August the corps of Barclay and Bagration finally succeeded to unite in Smolensk. On 5 August they held a council of war. Under pressure, Barclay de Tolly decided to launch an offensive. A Russian force was sent west. Napoleon hoped that the Russian advance would lead to the long-desired battle and the unification of the Russian armies forced Napoleon to change his plans.   On 15 August, Napoleon celebrated his 43rd birthday with a review of the army. In the late afternoon, Murat's cavalry and Ney's infantry closed up to the western side of Smolensk. The main body of the army did not come up until late the next day.

The Battle of Smolensk (1812) on August 16–18 became the first real confrontation. Napoleon surrounded the southern bank of the Dniepr, while the northern bank was guarded by Barclay's army. When Bagration moved further east, to prevent the French from crossing the river and attacking the Russians from behind, Napoleon began the attack on the Smolensk Kremlin in the evening.  In the middle of the night Barclay de Tolly withdrew his troops from the burning city to avoid a big battle with no chance of victory. When the French army moved in the Russians left on the east side. Ney, Junot and Oudinot tried to halt their army. The Battle of Valutino could have been decisive but the Russians succeeded to escape via a diversion on the road to Moscow. The French discussed their options or prepare for a new attack after winter. Napoleon pressed his army on after the Russians. Murat implored him to stop, but Napoleon could see nothing but Moscow. On 24 August, the Grande Armée marched out of Smolensk; Eugene on the left, Poniatowski on the right and Murat in the centre, with the Emperor, the Guard, I Corps and III Corps in the second line. Joseph Barbanègre was appointed commander of the devastated city and had to organise new supplies.

 Kutuzov in command

Meanwhile, Wittgenstein was forced to retreat to the north after the First Battle of Polotsk. Bagration asked Aleksey Arakcheyev to organize the militia, as Barclay had led the French right into the capital.  Political pressure on Barclay to give battle and the general's continuing reluctance to do so led to his removal after the defeat. On 20 August he was replaced in his position as commander-in-chief by the popular veteran Mikhail Kutuzov.  The former head of the St. Petersburg militia and a member of the State Council arrived on the 29th at Tsaryovo-Zaymishche, a border village.  The weather was still unbearably hot and Kutuzov went on with Barclay's successful strategy, using attrition warfare instead of risking the army in an open battle. Napoleon's superiority in numbers was almost eliminated. The Russian Army fell back ever deeper into Russia's interior as he continued to move east. Unable because of political pressure to give up Moscow without a fight, Kutuzov took up a defensive position some  before Moscow at Borodino.

The Battle of Borodino

 

The Battle of Borodino, fought on 7 September 1812, was the largest battle of the French invasion of Russia, involving more than 250,000 troops and resulting in at least 70,000 casualties. The French  under Emperor Napoleon I attacked the Imperial Russian Army of General Mikhail Kutuzov near the village of Borodino, west of the town of Mozhaysk, and eventually captured the main positions on the battlefield but failed to destroy the Russian army. About a third of Napoleon's soldiers were killed or wounded; Russian losses, while heavier, could be replaced due to Russia's large population, since Napoleon's campaign took place on Russian soil.

The battle ended with the Russian Army, while out of position, still offering resistance. The state of exhaustion of the French forces and the lack of recognition of the state of the Russian Army led Napoleon to remain on the battlefield with his army, instead of engaging in the forced pursuit that had marked other campaigns that he had conducted. The entirety of the Guard was still available to Napoleon, and in refusing to use it he lost this singular chance to destroy the Russian Army.  The battle at Borodino was a pivotal point in the campaign, as it was the last offensive action fought by Napoleon in Russia. By withdrawing, the Russian Army preserved its combat strength, eventually allowing it to force Napoleon out of the country.

The Battle of Borodino on September 7 was the bloodiest day of battle in the Napoleonic Wars. The Russian Army could only muster half of its strength on September 8. Kutuzov chose to act in accordance with his scorched earth tactics and retreat, leaving the road to Moscow open. Kutuzov also ordered the evacuation of the city.

By this point the Russians had managed to draft large numbers of reinforcements (volunteers) into the army, bringing total Russian land forces to their peak strength in 1812 of 904,000, with perhaps 100,000 in the vicinity of Moscow—the remnants of Kutuzov's army from Borodino partially reinforced.

Both armies began to move and rebuild.  The Russian retreat was significant for two reasons: firstly, the move was to the south and not the east; secondly, the Russians immediately began operations that would continue to deplete the French forces.  Platov, commanding the rear guard on September 8, offered such strong resistance that Napoleon remained on the Borodino field.  On the following day, Miloradovich assumed command of the rear guard, adding his forces to the formation.  

On 8 September the Russian army began retreating east from Borodino. They camped outside Mozhaysk. When the village of Mozhaysk was captured by the French on the 9th, the Grande Armée rested for two days to recover. Napoleon asked Berthier to send reinforcements from Smolensk to Moscow and from Minsk to Smolensk. The French Army began to move out on September 10 with the still ill Napoleon not leaving until the 12th. Some 18,000 men were ordered in from Smolensk, and Marshal Victor's corps supplied another 25,000.

Capture of Moscow

  

On 10 September the main quarter of the Russian army was situated at Bolshiye Vyazyomy. Kutuzov settled in a Vyazyomy Manor on the high road to Moscow. The owner was Dmitry Golitsyn, who entered military service again. The next day Tsar Alexander signed a document that Kutuzov was promoted General Field Marshal, the highest military rank of the Imperial Russian Army. Russian sources suggest Kutuzov wrote a number of orders and letters to Rostopchin, the Moscow military governor, about saving the city or the army. On , the main forces of Kutuzov departed from the village, now Golitsyno and camped near Odintsovo, 20 km to the west, followed by Mortier and Joachim Murat's vanguard. Napoleon Bonaparte, who suffered from a cold and lost his voice, spent the night at Vyazyomy Manor (on the same sofa in the library) within 24 hours. On Sunday afternoon the Russian military council at Fili discussed the risks and agreed to abandon Moscow without fighting. Leo Tolstoy wrote Fyodor Rostopchin was invited also and explained the difficult decision in quite a few remarkable chapters in his book War and Peace. This came at the price of losing Moscow, whose population was evacuated. Miloradovich would not give up his rearguard duties until September 14, allowing Moscow to be evacuated. Miloradovich finally retreated under a flag of truce. Kutuzov withdrew to the southeast of Moscow.

On September 14, 1812, Napoleon moved into Moscow. However, he was surprised to have received no delegation from the city. Before the order was received to evacuate Moscow, the city had a population of approximately 270,000 people. 48 hours later three quarters of Moscow was reduced to ashes by arson. Although Saint Petersburg was the political capital at that time, Napoleon had occupied Moscow, the spiritual capital of Russia, but Tsar Alexander I decided that there could not be peaceful coexistence with Napoleon. There would be no appeasement. On 19 September Murat lost sight of Kutuzov who changed direction and turned west to Podolsk  and Tarutino where he would be more protected by the surrounding hills and the Nara river. On 3 October Kutuzov and his entire staff arrived at Tarutino and camped there for two weeks. He controlled the three-pronged roads from Obninsk to Kaluga and Medyn so that Napoleon could not turn south or southwest. This position not only allowed him to harass the French lines of communication but also stay in contact with the Russian forces under Tormasov and Chichagov, commander of the Army of the Danube. He was also well placed to watch over the workshops and arms factories in nearby Tula and Briansk.  Kutuzov avoided frontal battles involving large masses of troops in order to reinforce his Russian army and to wait there for Napoleon's retreat. This tactic was sharply criticised by Chief of Staff Bennigsen and others, but also by Emperor Alexander. Barclay de Tolly interrupted his service for five months and settled in Nizhny Novgorod. Each side avoided the other and seemed no longer to wish to get into a fight. On 5 October, on order of Napoleon, the French ambassador Jacques Lauriston left Moscow to meet Kutuzov at his headquarters. Kutuzov agreed to meet, despite the orders of the Tsar. On 10 October Murat complained to Belliard about the lack of food and fodder; each day he lost 200 men captured by Russians. On 18 October, at dawn during breakfast, Murat's camp in a forest was surprised by an attack by forces led by Bennigsen, known as Battle of Winkovo. Bennigsen was supported by Kutuzov from his headquarters at distance. Bennigsen asked Kutuzov to provide troops for the pursuit. However, the General Field Marshal refused.

Retreat

As the Tsar refused to respond, and encouraged because the weather remained fine and warm into October, Napoleon stayed too long. On 19 October, after five weeks of occupation, the army left Moscow. The army still numbered 108,000 men, but his cavalry had been nearly destroyed. With horses exhausted or dead, commanders redirected cavalrymen into infantry units, leaving French forces helpless against Cossack fighters intensifying the guerilla warfare. With little direction or supplies, the army turned to leave the region, struggling on toward worse disaster. Napoleon followed the old Kaluga road southwards towards unspoilt, richer parts of Russia to use other roads for retreat westwards to Smolensk than the one being scorched by his own army for the march eastwards. Napoleon's goal was to get around Kutuzov, but he was stopped at Maloyaroslavets on his way to Medyn in the West.

At the Battle of Maloyaroslavets, Kutuzov was able to force the French Army into using the same Smolensk road on which they had earlier moved east, the corridor of which had been stripped of food by both armies. This is often presented as an example of scorched earth tactics.  Continuing to block the southern flank to prevent the French from returning by a different route, Kutuzov employed partisan tactics to repeatedly strike at the French train where it was weakest. As the retreating French train broke up and became separated, Cossack bands and light Russian cavalry assaulted isolated French units.

Supplying the army in full became an impossibility because of the continuous forests. The lack of grass and feed weakened the remaining horses, almost all of which died or were killed for food by starving soldiers. Without horses, the French cavalry ceased to exist; cavalrymen had to march on foot. Lack of horses meant many cannons and wagons had to be abandoned. The loss of thousands of wagons and trained horses weakened Napoleon's armies for the remainder of his wars. Starvation and disease took their toll, and desertion soared. Many of the deserters were taken prisoner or killed by Russian peasants. In early November 1812, when Napoleon arrived at Dorogobuzh Napoleon learned that General Claude de Malet had attempted a coup d'état in France. Badly weakened by these circumstances, the French military position collapsed. Russian armies captured the French supply depots at Polotsk, Vitebsk and Minsk, inflicting a logistical disaster on Napoleon's fast collapsing Russian operation. However, the union with Victor, Oudinot and Dombrowski at the Bobr brought the numerical strength of the Grande Armée back up to some 49,000 French combatants as well as about 40,000 stragglers. All the French corps went on to Borisov where a strategic bridge to cross the Berezina was destroyed by the Russian army. Because of an incursion of thaw the ice on the Berezina river started to melt during the last major battle of the campaign. In military terms the escape can be considered as French tactical victory. It was a missed opportunity for the Russians who blamed Pavel Chichagov. 

On 3 December Napoleon published the 29th Bulletin in which he informed the outside world for the first time of the catastrophic state of his army. He abandoned the army on 5 December and returned home on a sleigh, leaving Marshal Joachim Murat in command.  In the following weeks, the  shrank further, and on 14 December 1812, it left Russian territory.

Cold weather

Following the campaign a saying arose that General Winter defeated Napoleon, alluding to the Russian Winter. Minard's map shows that the opposite is true as the French losses were highest in the summer and autumn, due to inadequate preparation of logistics resulting in insufficient supplies, while many troops were also killed by disease. Thus the outcome of the campaign was decided long before the cold weather became a factor.

When winter arrived in November, the army was still equipped with summer clothing and did not have the means to protect themselves from the cold or snow. It had also failed to forge caulkin shoes for the horses to enable them to traverse roads that had become iced over. The most devastating effect of the cold weather upon Napoleon's forces occurred during their retreat. Starvation and gangrene coupled with hypothermia led to the loss of tens of thousands of men. Heavy loot was thrown away; much of the artillery was left behind. In his memoir, Napoleon's close adviser Armand de Caulaincourt recounted scenes of massive loss, and offered a vivid description of mass death through hypothermia:

This befell a  that was ill-equipped for cold weather.  The French deficiencies in equipment caused by the assumption that their campaign would be concluded before the cold weather set in were a large factor in the number of casualties they suffered. From the Berezina, the retreat was nothing but utter flight. The preservation of war materiel and military positions was no longer considered. When the night-time temperature dropped to minus 35 degrees Celsius it proved catastrophic for Loison's untried soldiers. Within three days, his division of 15,000 soldiers lost 12,000 men without a battle.

Summary

In Napoleon's Russian Campaign, Riehn sums up the limitations of Napoleon's logistics as follows:
The military machine Napoleon the artilleryman had created was perfectly suited to fight short, violent campaigns, but whenever a long-term sustained effort was in the offing, it tended to expose feet of clay. [...] In the end, the logistics of the French military machine proved wholly inadequate. The experiences of short campaigns had left the French supply services completed unprepared for [..] Russia, and this was despite the precautions Napoleon had taken. There was no quick remedy that might have repaired these inadequacies from one campaign to the next. [...] The limitations of horse-drawn transport and the road networks to support it were simply not up to the task. Indeed, modern militaries have long been in agreement that Napoleon's military machine at its apex, and the scale on which he attempted to operate with it in 1812 and 1813, had become an anachronism that could succeed only with the use of railroads and the telegraph. And these had not yet been invented.  
Napoleon lacked the apparatus to efficiently move so many troops across such large distances of hostile territory. The supply depots established by the French in the Russian interior were too far behind the main army. The French train battalions tried to move forward huge amounts of supplies during the campaign, but the distances, the speed required, and missing endurance of the requisitioned vehicles that broke down too easily meant that the demands Napoleon placed on them were too great. As the graph of Charles Joseph Minard, given below, shows, the  incurred the majority of its losses during the march to Moscow during the summer and autumn.

Historical assessment

Grande Armée

Anthony Joes wrote in the Journal of Conflict Studies that figures on how many men Napoleon took into Russia and how many eventually came out vary widely. Georges Lefebvre says that Napoleon crossed the Niemen with over 600,000 soldiers, only half of whom were from France, the others being mainly Poles and Germans. Felix Markham thinks that 450,000 crossed the Neman on 25 June 1812. When Ney and the rearguard recrossed the Niemen on December 14, he had barely a thousand men fit for action. James Marshall-Cornwall says 510,000 Imperial troops entered Russia. Eugene Tarle believes that 420,000 crossed with Napoleon and 150,000 eventually followed, for a grand total of 570,000. Richard K. Riehn provides the following figures: 685,000 men marched into Russia in 1812, of whom around 355,000 were French; 31,000 soldiers marched out again in some sort of military formation, with perhaps another 35,000 stragglers, for a total of fewer than 70,000 known survivors. Adam Zamoyski estimated that between 550,000 and 600,000 French and allied troops (including reinforcements) operated beyond the Niemen, of which as many as 400,000 troops died but this includes deaths of prisoners during captivity.

Minard's famous infographic (see above) depicts the march ingeniously by showing the size of the advancing army, overlaid on a rough map, as well as the retreating soldiers together with temperatures recorded (as much as 30 below zero on the Réaumur scale) on their return. The numbers on this chart have 422,000 crossing the Neman with Napoleon, 22,000 taking a side trip early on in the campaign, 100,000 surviving the battles en route to Moscow and returning from there; only 4,000 survive the march back, to be joined by 6,000 that survived from that initial 22,000 in the feint attack northward; in the end, only 10,000 crossed the Neman back out of the initial 422,000.

Imperial Russian Army

Barclay de Tolly the Minister of War and field commander of the First Western Army and General of Infantry served as the Commander in Chief of the Russian Armies. According to Tolstoy in War and Peace (Book X) he was unpopular and regarded as a foreigner by Bagration who was higher in rank but had to follow his orders. Kutuzov replaced Barclay and acted as Commander-in-chief during the retreat following the Battle of Smolensk.

These forces, however, could count on reinforcements from the second line, which totalled 129,000 men and 8,000 Cossacks with 434 guns and 433 rounds of ammunition.

Of these, about 105,000 men were actually available for the defence against the invasion. In the third line were the 36 recruit depots and militias, which came to a total of approximately 161,000 men of various and highly disparate military values, of which about 133,000 actually took part in the defence.

Thus, the grand total of all the forces was 488,000 men, of which about 428,000 gradually came into action against the Grande Armee. This bottom line, however, includes more than 80,000 Cossacks and militiamen, as well as about 20,000 men who garrisoned the fortresses in the operational area. The majority of the officer corps came from the aristocracy. About 7% of the officer corps came from the Baltic German nobility from the governorates of Estonia and Livonia. Because the Baltic German nobles tended to be better educated than the ethnic Russian nobility, the Baltic Germans were often favoured with positions in high command and various technical positions. The Russian Empire had no universal educational system, and those who could afford it had to hire tutors and/or send their children to private schools. The educational level of the Russian nobility and gentry varied enormously depending on the quality of the tutors and/or private schools, with some Russian nobles being extremely well educated while others were just barely literate. The Baltic German nobility was more inclined to invest in their children's education than the ethnic Russian nobility, which led to the government favouring them when granting officers' commissions. Of the 800 doctors in the Russian Army in 1812, almost all of them were Baltic Germans. The British historian Dominic Lieven noted that, at the time, the Russian elite defined Russianness in terms of loyalty to the House of Romanov rather in terms of language or culture, and as the Baltic German aristocrats were very loyal, they were considered and considered themselves to be Russian despite speaking German as their first language.

Sweden, Russia's only ally, did not send supporting troops, but the alliance made it possible to withdraw the 45,000-man Russian corps Steinheil from Finland and use it in the later battles (20,000 men were sent to Riga and Polotsk).

Losses

 

Napoleon lost more than 500,000 men in Russia. Out of an original force of 615,000, only 110,000 frostbitten and half-starved survivors stumbled back.

 

Rather, its various units disintegrated and the troops scattered. Later, some of its personnel were collected and reorganised into the new Dutch army.

Most of the Prussian contingent survived thanks to the Convention of Tauroggen and almost the whole Austrian contingent under Schwarzenberg withdrew successfully. The Russians formed the Russian-German Legion from other German prisoners and deserters.

Russian casualties in the few open battles are comparable to the French losses, but civilian losses along the devastating campaign route were much higher than the military casualties. In total, despite earlier estimates giving figures of several million dead, around one million were killed, including civilians—fairly evenly split between the French and Russians. Military losses amounted to 300,000 French, about 72,000 Poles, 50,000 Italians, 80,000 Germans, and 61,000 from 16 other nations. As well as the loss of human life, the French also lost some 150,000 horses and over 1,300 artillery pieces.

The losses of the Russian armies are difficult to assess. The 19th-century historian Michael Bogdanovich assessed reinforcements of the Russian armies during the war using the Military Registry archives of the General Staff.  According to this, the reinforcements totalled 134,000 men. The main army at the time of capture of Vilna in December had 70,000 men, whereas its number at the start of the invasion had been about 150,000. Thus, total losses would come to 210,000 men. Of these, about 40,000 returned to duty. Losses of the formations operating in secondary areas of operations as well as losses in militia units were about 40,000. Thus, he came up with the number of 210,000 men and militiamen.

Aftermath
The Russian victory over the French Army in 1812 was a significant blow to Napoleon's ambitions of European dominance. This war was the reason the other coalition allies triumphed once and for all over Napoleon. His army was shattered and morale was low, both for French troops still in Russia, fighting battles just before the campaign ended, and for the troops on other fronts. Napoleon alone was able to maintain any semblance of order; with his disappearance, Murat and the other officers lost all authority.

In January 1813 the French army gathered behind the Vistula some 23,000 strong. The Austrian and Prussian troops mustered some 35,000 men in addition. The number of deserters and stragglers having left Russia alive is unknown by definition. The number of new inhabitants of Russia is unknown. The number of prisoners is estimated at around 100,000, of whom more than 50,000 died in captivity.

The War of the Sixth Coalition started in 1813 as the Russian campaign was decisive for the Napoleonic Wars and led to Napoleon's defeat and exile on the island of Elba. For Russia, the term Patriotic War (an English rendition of the Russian Отечественная война) became a symbol for a strengthened national identity that had a great effect on Russian patriotism in the 19th century. A series of revolutions followed, starting with the Decembrist revolt of 1825 and ending with the February Revolution of 1917.

Alternative names
The French invasion is known as the Russian campaign, the Second Polish War, the Second Polish campaign, the Patriotic War of 1812, or the War of 1812. It should not be confused with the Great Patriotic War, a term for Hitler's invasion of Russia during the Second World War. The Patriotic War of 1812 is also occasionally referred to as simply the "War of 1812", a term which should not be confused with the conflict between Great Britain and the United States, also known as the War of 1812. In Russian literature written before the Russian revolution, the war was occasionally described as "the invasion of twelve languages". Napoleon termed this war the "Second Polish War" in an attempt to gain increased support from Polish nationalists and patriots. Though the stated goal of the war was the resurrection of the Polish state on the territories of the former Polish–Lithuanian Commonwealth (modern territories of Poland, Lithuania, Latvia, Estonia, Belarus and Ukraine), in fact, this issue was of no real concern to Napoleon.

Historiography

The British historian Dominic Lieven wrote that much of the historiography about the campaign for various reasons distorts the story of the Russian war against France in 1812–14. The number of Western historians who are fluent in French and/or German vastly outnumbers those who are fluent in Russian, which has the effect that many Western historians simply ignore Russian language sources when writing about the campaign because they cannot read them.

Memoirs written by French veterans of the campaign together with much of the work done by French historians strongly show the influence of "Orientalism", which depicted Russia as a strange, backward, exotic and barbaric "Asian" nation that was innately inferior to the West, especially France. The picture drawn by the French is that of a vastly superior army being defeated by geography, the climate and just plain bad luck. German-language sources are not as hostile to the Russians as French sources, but many of the Prussian officers such as Carl von Clausewitz (who did not speak Russian) who joined the Russian Army to fight against the French found service with a foreign army both frustrating and strange, and their accounts reflected these experiences. Lieven compared those historians who use Clausewitz's account of his time in Russian service as their main source for the 1812 campaign to those historians who might use an account written by a Free French officer who did not speak English who served with the British Army in World War II as their main source for the British war effort in the Second World War.

In Russia, the official historical line until 1917 was that the peoples of the Russian Empire had rallied together in defence of the throne against a foreign invader. Because many of the younger Russian officers in the 1812 campaign took part in the Decembrist uprising of 1825, their roles in history were erased at the order of Emperor Nicholas I. Likewise, because many of the officers who were also veterans who stayed loyal during the Decembrist uprising went on to become ministers in the tyrannical regime of Emperor Nicholas I, their reputations were blacked among the radical intelligentsia of 19th century Russia. For example, Count Alexander von Benckendorff fought well in 1812 commanding a Cossack company, but because he later become the Chief of the Third Section Of His Imperial Majesty's Chancellery as the secret police were called, was one of the closest friends of Nicholas I and is infamous for his persecution of Russia's national poet Alexander Pushkin, he is not well remembered in Russia and his role in 1812 is usually ignored.

Furthermore, the 19th century was a great age of nationalism and there was a tendency by historians in the Allied nations to give the lion's share of the credit for defeating France to their own respective nation with British historians claiming that it was the United Kingdom that played the most important role in defeating Napoleon; Austrian historians giving that honour to their nation; Russian historians writing that it was Russia that played the greatest role in the victory, and Prussian and later German historians writing that it was Prussia that made the difference. In such a context, various historians liked to diminish the contributions of their allies.

Leo Tolstoy was not a historian, but his extremely popular 1869 historical novel War and Peace, which depicted the war as a triumph of what Lieven called the "moral strength, courage and patriotism of ordinary Russians" with military leadership a negligible factor, has shaped the popular understanding of the war in both Russia and abroad from the 19th century onward. A recurring theme of War and Peace is that certain events are just fated to happen, and there is nothing that a leader can do to challenge destiny, a view of history that dramatically discounts leadership as a factor in history. During the Soviet period, historians engaged in what Lieven called huge distortions to make history fit with Communist ideology, with Marshal Kutuzov and Prince Bagration transformed into peasant generals, Alexander I alternatively ignored or vilified, and the war becoming a massive "People's War" fought by the ordinary people of Russia with almost no involvement on the part of the government. During the Cold War, many Western historians were inclined to see Russia as "the enemy", and there was a tendency to downplay and dismiss Russia's contributions to the defeat of Napoleon. As such, Napoleon's claim that the Russians did not defeat him and he was just the victim of fate in 1812 was very appealing to many Western historians.

Russian historians tended to focus on the French invasion of Russia in 1812 and ignore the campaigns in 1813–1814 fought in Germany and France, because a campaign fought on Russian soil was regarded as more important than campaigns abroad and because in 1812 the Russians were commanded by the ethnic Russian Kutuzov while in the campaigns in 1813–1814 the senior Russian commanders were mostly ethnic Germans, being either Baltic German nobility or Germans who had entered Russian service. At the time the conception held by the Russian elite was that the Russian empire was a multi-ethnic entity, in which the Baltic German aristocrats in service to the House of Romanov were considered part of that elite—an understanding of what it meant to be Russian defined in terms of dynastic loyalty rather than language, ethnicity, and culture that does not appeal to those later Russians who wanted to see the war as purely a triumph of ethnic Russians.

One consequence of this is that many Russian historians liked to disparage the officer corps of the Imperial Russian Army because of the high proportion of Baltic Germans serving as officers, which further reinforces the popular stereotype that the Russians won despite their officers rather than because of them. Furthermore, Emperor  Alexander I often gave the impression at the time that he found Russia a place that was not worthy of his ideals, and he cared more about Europe as a whole than about Russia. Alexander's conception of a war to free Europe from Napoleon lacked appeal to many nationalist-minded Russian historians, who preferred to focus on a campaign in defence of the homeland rather than what Lieven called Alexander's rather "murky" mystical ideas about European brotherhood and security. Lieven observed that for every book written in Russia on the campaigns of 1813–1814, there are a hundred books on the campaign of 1812 and that the most recent Russian grand history of the war of 1812–1814 gave 490 pages to the campaign of 1812 and 50 pages to the campaigns of 1813–1814. Lieven noted that Tolstoy ended War and Peace in December 1812 and that many Russian historians have followed Tolstoy in focusing on the campaign of 1812 while ignoring the greater achievements of campaigns of 1813–1814 that ended with the Russians marching into Paris.

Napoleon did not touch serfdom in Russia. What the reaction of the Russian peasantry would have been if he had lived up to the traditions of the French Revolution, bringing liberty to the serfs, is an intriguing question.

Swedish invasion
Napoleon's invasion was prefigured by the Swedish invasion of Russia a century before. In 1707 Charles XII had led Swedish forces in an invasion of Russia from his base in Poland. After initial success, the Swedish Army was decisively defeated in Ukraine at the Battle of Poltava. Peter I's efforts to deprive the invading forces of supplies by adopting a scorched-earth policy is thought to have played a role in the defeat of the Swedes.

In one first-hand account of the French invasion, Philippe Paul, Comte de Ségur, attached to the personal staff of Napoleon and the author of Histoire de Napoléon et de la grande armée pendant l'année 1812, recounted a Russian emissary approaching the French headquarters early in the campaign. When he was questioned on what Russia expected, his curt reply was simply 'Poltava!'. Using eyewitness accounts, historian Paul Britten Austin described how Napoleon studied the History of Charles XII during the invasion. In an entry dated 5 December 1812, one eyewitness records: "Cesare de Laugier, as he trudges on along the 'good road' that leads to Smorgonie, is struck by 'some birds falling from frozen trees', a phenomenon which had even impressed Charles XII's Swedish soldiers a century ago." The failed Swedish invasion is widely believed to have been the beginning of Sweden's decline as a great power, and the rise of Tsardom of Russia as it took its place as the leading nation of north-eastern Europe.

German invasion

Academicians have drawn parallels between the French invasion of Russia and Operation Barbarossa, the German invasion of 1941. David Stahel writes:

The invasion by Germany was called the Great Patriotic War by the Soviet people, to evoke comparisons with the victory by Tsar Alexander I over Napoleon's invading army. In addition, the Germans, like the French, took solace from the notion they had been defeated by the Russian winter, rather than the Russians themselves or their own mistakes.

Cultural impact
An event of epic proportions and momentous importance for European history, the French invasion of Russia has been the subject of much discussion among historians. The campaign's sustained role in Russian popular culture may be seen in Leo Tolstoy's War and Peace, Pyotr Ilyich Tchaikovsky's 1812 Overture, and the identification of it with the German invasion during World War II, which became known as the Great Patriotic War in the Soviet Union.

See also

 Antony's Parthian War, a Roman invasion of Parthian Empire, which is widely compared to Napoleon's invasion of Russia
 Arches of Triumph in Novocherkassk, a monument built in 1817 to commemorate the victory over the French
 General Confederation of Kingdom of Poland
 Kutuzov (film)
 List of battles of the French invasion of Russia
 List of In Our Time programmes, including "Napoleon's retreat from Moscow"
 Nadezhda Durova
 Vasilisa Kozhina
 War and Peace (film series)
 War and Peace (opera), an opera by Prokofiev

Notes

References

Sources
 
 
 
 
 
 
  And at Google Books here  (accessed 7 Jan 2022).

Further reading

External links

 
 When Europe Invaded Russia: 1812 Napoleon Documentary by Jesse Alexander on YouTube

 
 
Campaigns of the Napoleonic Wars
19th-century conflicts
Conflicts in 1812
Wars involving Russia
Wars involving France
19th century in the Russian Empire
1812 in the Russian Empire
1812 in France
France–Russia military relations
Invasions by France
Invasions of Russia